Quarterly Review of Wines, abbreviated QRW, is a U.S. quarterly publication with an emphasis on wine, food and travel. Published by Richard L. Elia, the first issue was released in 1977. QRW contributors include Michael Broadbent MW, David Peppercorn MW, Serena Sutcliffe MW. Clive Coates MW, Rosemary George MW, Ed McCarthy, Jacqueline Friedrich, Burton Anderson and Gerald D. Boyd. On 1 November 2011, the magazine discontinued its print version and went online.

References

External links
Quarterly Review of Wines official site

Online magazines published in the United States
Quarterly magazines published in the United States
Defunct magazines published in the United States
Magazines established in 1977
Magazines disestablished in 2011
Online magazines with defunct print editions
Wine magazines
Magazines published in Massachusetts